Exposure is the debut solo album by guitarist and composer Robert Fripp. Unique among Fripp solo projects for its focus on the pop song format, it grew out of his previous collaborations with David Bowie, Peter Gabriel, and Daryl Hall, and the latter two singers appear on the album. Released in 1979, it peaked at No. 79 on the Billboard Album Chart. Most of the lyrics were provided by the poet and lyricist Joanna Walton, who was later killed on Pan Am Flight 103.

Background
After terminating the first run of King Crimson in 1974, studying at the International Academy for Continuous Education through 1975-1976 and assisting Peter Gabriel in both studio and stage capacities, Fripp moved in 1977 to the Hell's Kitchen neighbourhood of New York City. New York was then a centre of punk rock and what would come to be known as new wave, and Fripp became part of the scene, playing and recording with Blondie and the Roche sisters, absorbing the sounds of the active downtown music scene. He envisioned a new approach, and incorporated elements of these NYC experiences into his current palette, including "Frippertronics", the tape-delay/looping technique he had developed with Brian Eno. At Eno's invitation, Fripp performed on David Bowie's "Heroes" single and album in 1977.

Originally, Fripp envisioned Exposure as the third part of a simultaneous trilogy also comprising Daryl Hall's Sacred Songs and Peter Gabriel's second album aka Scratch, both of which Fripp contributed to and produced. Fripp's aim with the trilogy "was to investigate the 'pop song' as a means of expression. I think it's an incredibly good way of putting forward ideas. I think it's a supreme discipline to know that you have three to four minutes to get together all your lost emotions and find words of one syllable or less to put forward all your ideas. It's a discipline of form that I don't think is cheap or shoddy". The album was to be originally titled The Last Great New York Heartthrob and feature a track list configuration different from that of the final release. Hall's management and label resisted the project, fearing the music would damage Hall's commercial appeal, insisting as well that Exposure be equally credited to Hall, initially Fripp's main vocalist. Fripp instead used only two Hall vocals on his album, substituting Peter Hammill and Terre Roche in various places.

The trilogy did not work out as intended, although all the albums were released. "Urban Landscape" appears on the Hall album, as does "NYCNY" ("I May Not Have Had Enough of Me but I've Had Enough of You", with different lyrics written by Hall). The Gabriel record also features a version of "Exposure". "Here Comes the Flood" had previously appeared with a prog-rock arrangement on Gabriel's first album, but Gabriel disliked the production, and created a simpler rendition of the song for Exposure.

Fripp stated in the liner notes that Exposure "is indebted to all those who took part in the hazardous series of events culminating in this record, and several who do not appear but who helped determine the final shape: Tim Cappella, Alirio Lima, Ian McDonald and John Wetton".

The version of the album that was released, after the changes and compromises that had to be made, was reconceptualized as part of a new trilogy, "The Drive to 1981", marking the beginning of three-year campaigns by Fripp as a professional musician, which would include an album of Frippertronics and one of "Discotronics", to be released between September 1979 and September 1980. Both album concepts were released together as God Save the Queen/Under Heavy Manners, with each concept getting its own followup－The League of Gentlemen for Discotronics and Let the Power Fall for Frippertronics, making for a five-step trilogy. The end of The Drive to 1981 marked the beginning of "the incline to 1984", Fripp's tenure with a reformed King Crimson, originally intended as Discipline.

Fripp's tour to support Exposure was strictly a solo tour, utilizing only his own electric guitar and Frippertronics, and included then unorthodox rock music venues such as restaurants and retail outlets.

Release
The album was remixed in 1983, and this second "definitive edition" was released in 1985 featuring some alternate takes. In 2006, a 24-bit two-disc remaster appeared on Fripp's Discipline Global Mobile label. One disc contained the original 1979 album, and the second disc contained a third version of Exposure with bonus tracks. The "definitive edition" version of "Chicago" is not included on the 2006 version; however, the version of the song on disc two is mostly identical to the definitive edition version with minor variants. A facsimile of that second edition can be created by programming the contents of the second disc as 1-2-3-20-5-21-22-8-9-10-11-12-13-14-15-16-17. There was also a version of "Water Music II" that ran more than 6 minutes. On the 1985 remix, the vinyl label lists the song at 6:10 while there are CD versions that list the song at 6:24. These are the same.  The 6:10 timing on the vinyl remix was in error. Adding further confusion, many CDs that list the song as 6:24 on the track list actually contain the edited 3:52 version. The 6:24 version is on some early CD versions, but since the catalogue numbers are the same, finding one remains problematic. It is not on the 2006 remaster, even though it contains the remixed version (it runs 3:55).

Reception

Paul Stump, in his 1997 History of Progressive Rock, called the album "formidably eloquent" and "breathlessly diverse", adding that while it is conventional in style, it has a remarkable coherence that presages the approach used by the 1980s incarnation of King Crimson.

Track listing

Side one

Side two

2006 bonus disc third edition

2006 bonus tracks (alternate takes)

Personnel
 Robert Fripp – guitars, Frippertronics; vocal on "Exposure"
 Daryl Hall – vocals on "Preface", "You Burn Me Up", "North Star", "Disengage II", "Chicago" disc two, "New York" disc two, "Exposure" bonus track and "Mary" bonus track; piano on "You Burn Me Up" and "Chicago"
 Terre Roche – vocals on "Mary", "Exposure", "I've Had Enough of You" and "Chicago" bonus track
 Peter Hammill – vocals on "Disengage", "Chicago", "I've Had Enough of You" and "Disengage" bonus track, "Chicago" bonus track
 Peter Gabriel – vocals and piano on "Here Comes the Flood"; voice on "Preface"
 Brian Eno – synthesizer on "North Star" and "Here Comes the Flood"; voice on "Preface", "Hååden Two" and "Postscript"
 Barry Andrews – organ on "Disengage", "NY3" and "I've Had Enough of You"
 Sid McGinnis – rhythm guitar on "Exposure"; pedal steel guitar on "North Star"
 Tony Levin – bass
 Jerry Marotta – drums on "You Burn Me Up", "Chicago", "Exposure" and "Hååden Two"
 Narada Michael Walden – drums on "Breathless", "NY3" and "I've Had Enough of You"
 Phil Collins – drums on "Disengage" and "North Star"
Technical
 Ed Sprigg – engineer
 Steve Short – engineer
 Chris Stein – design, photography
 Robert Fripp - handwriting 
 Amos Poe – VTR imagery
 Mary Lou Green – hair
 Mrs. Edith Fripp – speaking voice on introduction to "Disengage"
 Mrs. Evelyn Harris – voice
 J.G. Bennett – voice on "Exposure", "Hååden Two", "First Inaugural Address" and "Water Music I"
 Shivapuri Baba – voice on "You Burn Me Up"
 Simon Heyworth – digital remastering

Charts

References

External links
 Claas Kazzer's Exposure Pages at Elephant Talk
 Detailed analysis for white label test pressing of Exposure from 1978
 Remaster Hell – blog post with details about the 2006 remaster of the album

1979 debut albums
Robert Fripp albums
Albums produced by Robert Fripp
E.G. Records albums